Paul Coche (26 January 1904 – 24 November 1996) was a French modern pentathlete. He competed at the 1928 Summer Olympics.

References

External links
 

1904 births
1996 deaths
French male modern pentathletes
Olympic modern pentathletes of France
Modern pentathletes at the 1928 Summer Olympics